Cercle athlétique mulhousien  was a French basketball club based in Mulhouse.

History 
The club is best known for its good performance in the championship of France basketball from 1920, counting among its members several prominent players.

The rivalry with Foyer alsacien Mulhouse is one of the first for the elite basketball division.

The women's section won for the first time the championship of France in 1937.

Honours 

Men

French League
 Winners (2): 1934-35, 1936–37

Women

French League
 Winners (1): 1936-37

Notable players 
  Charles Hemmerlin
  Étienne Onimus

Basketball teams in France